The McCook County Courthouse, at 130 W. Essex Ave. in Salem, South Dakota, is a Moderne style courthouse built in 1934.  It was listed on the National Register of Historic Places in 1993.

It is a three-story concrete building clad with brick.

It was designed by architects Kings & Dixon.

References

Courthouses in South Dakota		
Courthouses on the National Register of Historic Places in South Dakota
Moderne architecture in the United States
Art Deco architecture in South Dakota
Government buildings completed in 1934
McCook County, South Dakota
1934 establishments in South Dakota